The Paratriathlon at the 2020 Summer Paralympics – Men's PTS4 event at the 2020 Paralympic Games took place at 06:30 on 28 August 2021 at the Odaiba Marine Park. The PTWC classification combined two functional classifications, both of which used handbikes and racing wheelchairs for the bike and run respectively, but with different impairment levels. To ensure as far as possible even competition, therefore, PTWC2 athletes were given a delay at the start of 3 minutes 08 seconds, a time period calculated as sufficient to even out the performance difference between that class and the more impaired PTWC1 class.

Results
Key : T = Transition; L = Lap

Source:

References

Paratriathlon at the 2020 Summer Paralympics